Samuni Dam  is a gravity dam located in Hokkaido Prefecture in Japan. The dam is used for flood control. The catchment area of the dam is 54.9 km2. The dam impounds about 44  ha of land when full and can store 6200 thousand cubic meters of water. The construction of the dam was started on 1968 and completed in 1975.

References

Dams in Hokkaido